Pub Choir (also Couch Choir during the COVID-19 pandemic) is a musical act founded in Brisbane, Australia, directed by Astrid Jorgensen.<ref>"Pub Choir is for everyone, no matter how bad your singing is". Scenestr, 8 April 2019.</ref>

At each Pub Choir event Jorgensen arranges a popular song and teaches it to the audience in three-part harmony, concluding with a performance which is filmed and shared on social media. There is no formal recurring membership and participants purchase tickets to attend each show, which is usually held at a licensed venue.

 Background 

The first Pub Choir event was held in West End, Brisbane at venue The Bearded Lady in March 2017. At the inaugural event 80 attendees learned Jorgensen's arrangement of "Slice of Heaven" by Dave Dobbyn. Jorgensen founded Pub Choir "to help regular people reclaim music in their lives, free of pressure or judgement".

In November 2017 Pub Choir's rendition of Zombie by The Cranberries went viral on the internet, and was shared by the band themselves shortly after the death of lead singer, Dolores O’Riordan. Other artists including Mariah Carey, Sir Barry Gibb, The Killers and Kiss have also praised and shared Pub Choir's arrangements of their songs. In 2022, Pub Choir's video of "Running Up That Hill" garnered international media attention when Kate Bush shared a statement describing the performance as "utterly, utterly wonderful!".

Pub Choir has held events widely around Australia,"Let that inhibition go': Vocal support drives Pub Choir's success“. The Age, 31 January 2019."'Pubs in harmony as singers take over the bar for Festival of Voices Pub Choir Events". The Mercury, 10 July 2018."'Pub Choir to take over Toowoomba bar". The Toowoomba Chronicle, 20 March 2018. as well as in New Zealand, the United States and England. On 5 April 2018 Pub Choir performed at the 2018 Commonwealth Games. On 20 July 2019 Pub Choir performed at Splendour In The Grass.

 Special guests 
Pub Choir has featured guest appearances by several notable musicians and celebrities. The first guest appearance in March 2018 by John Collins of Powderfinger for a performance of "My Happiness" received significant media attention, with a three-page feature in The Australian by journalist Andrew McMillen and a long-form radio piece on ABC's Radio National Breakfast program, hosted by Fran Kelly.

In 2018 other notable musical guests included:

 Chris Cheney of The Living End
 Felix Riebl of The Cat Empire
 Ben Ely of Regurgitator
 John Willsteed and Adele Pickvance formerly of The Go-Betweens

In 2019 musical guests included:

 Patience Hodgson of The Grates
 Ella Hooper of Killing Heidi
 Samuel Cromack of Ball Park Music
 Danielle Caruana of Mama Kin
 Tania Doko of Bachelor Girl
 Shane Howard of Goanna
 Darren Middleton of Powderfinger
Lior
Meg Mac
Jim Moginie of Midnight Oil
Ben Lee

In 2020 musical guests included:

 Paul Kelly

In 2022 guests included:

 Tim Freedman of The Whitlams
 Judith Lucy
 Mark Gable of The Choirboys
 Jason Singh of Taxiride

In 2018 Pub Choir was featured in Hit Network's national advertising campaign, with multiple presenters appearing at shows including Grant Denyer, Dave Hughes, Kate Langbroek, and Ed Kavalee.

 Philanthropy 
Pub Choir has regularly partnered with local charities, often donating a portion of ticket sales and raising money at events.

In 2018 Pub Choir raised over $19,000 for the charity MND and Me in honour of Pub Choir regular attendee, John Hanley. Subsequently, John Hanley's involvement with Pub Choir caught the attention of ABC TV producers for the show "The Recording Studio", in which Hanley was featured in the inaugural episode on 16 April 2019.

On 20 December 2018 Pub Choir sold out a Christmas event at Brisbane City Hall for a performance of "How to Make Gravy" by Paul Kelly. Samuel Johnson (OAM) was the guest speaker, and the event raised over $108,000 for Samuel's charity, "Love Your Sister". In 2019, their Christmas event raised over $134,000 for Women's Legal Service Queensland.

On 14 June 2019 Jorgensen was awarded the Queensland Community Foundation Emerging Philanthropist of the Year as a result of her charitable work with Pub Choir.

Couch Choir
During the 2020 COVID-19 pandemic a virtual choir named Couch Choir was created as an online equivalent of Pub Choir. In July 2020 it created a video including 1,534 contributions from people in 40 countries. In 2020, Couch Choir's video performance of Close to You by The Carpenters was added to the collection of the Australian National Communications Museum. Couch Choir's 2020 Christmas video of All I Want For Christmas Is You featured the Queensland Symphony Orchestra and was shared online by Mariah Carey, raising over $31,000 for the charity GIVIT.

Australia's Biggest Singalong!
The inaugural television special Australia's Biggest Singalong!'' was broadcast live on SBS from the Sydney Town Hall on 5 June 2021. The two-hour special was co-created by Pub Choir in collaboration with Artemis Media and SBS and was hosted by Julia Zemiro and Miranda Tapsell. Throughout the interactive special, Jorgensen and Yasso taught the live audience and home viewers a vocal arrangement of "Throw Your Arms Around Me" by Hunters & Collectors in real-time, with guest performances by Dami Im and Mitch Tambo. The show culminated in a final performance which was accompanied by Mark Seymour.

See also
Choir! Choir! Choir!, a similar open participation choir in Toronto, Ontario, Canada

References

External links
 

Australian choirs